Banam Rud (also Romanized as Banam Rūd) is a village in Zohan Rural District, Zohan District, Zirkuh County, South Khorasan Province, Iran. At the 2006 census, its population was 429, in 101 families.

References 

Populated places in Zirkuh County